Kiriburu is a census town in Jharkhand.
The town is mainly known for having big Iron-ore Mines KIOM (Kiriburu Iron-Ore Mine) & MIOM (Meghahatuburu Iron-Ore Mine)both governed by Steel Authority of India Limited (SAIL). The road connecting the township to the mines is divided by the border of Odisha and Jharkhand. It is also a famous hill station situated in the core of Saranda forest. Saranda forest is land of seven hundred hills. The name of the forest Saranda is due to the large number of elephants found in this forest (saranda means elephants). The forest has some waterfalls.

Overview
The towns of Kiriburu and Meghahatuburu are contiguous, sharing many local facilities, although Kiriburu is in Jharkhand Pashchimi Singhbhum district. The official pin codes of Kiriburu and Meghahatuburu is 833222 And 833223 Most of the People work in SAIL Iron Ore Mines.

Demographics
 India census, Kiriburu had a population of 9,545. Males constitute 52% of the population and females 48%. Kiriburu has an average literacy rate of 67%, higher than the national average of 59.5%: male literacy is 76%, and female literacy is 57%. In Kiriburu, 14% of the population is under 6 years of age, set by sharma. The local inhabitants are known as Ho people. It is also located in the maoists belt.

Kiriburu is easily accessible and is connected to various important places. The road from Kiriburu to Jamshedpur and Ranchi has been upgraded by the iron companies. The other route is to Orissa (Barbil) and Manoharpur station.  It can be reached from Tatanagar by road or by rail, the nearest railway station being Barajamda, 24 km away. Mining town of Barbil in the Keonjhar District of Orissa is 28 km from Meghahataburu by road. Direct Train - Jan Shatabdi- from Howrah (West Bengal) is available up to Barbil, from where you can catch hired taxis / SAIL Company bus to Kiriburu or Meghahatuburu.

Kiriburu is sometimes compared to Shimla and Cherapuji. In a year there is 200 cm(approx) of rain in Kiriburu. In Meghahatuburu, there is a guest house in a corner of the town.

There are no colleges in there but there are mainly two schools, Project Central School in Kiriburu and Kendriya Vidyalaya in Meghahataburu. Both are C.B.S.E boards and till class 12th and offer subjects like science, arts, and commerce (K.V). Students usually rely on school and personal coaching for study. Both the schools have big playgrounds as per city standards and allows games like cricket, football, handball and various local games.

References 

Mining communities in India
Cities and towns in West Singhbhum district